Al Jubail (828) is an Al Jubail-class corvette of the Royal Saudi Navy.

Development and design 
In July 2018 it was announced that Navantia had signed an agreement with the Royal Saudi Navy for the production of five Avante 2000 corvettes with the last to be delivered by 2022 at a cost of approximately 2 billion Euros.

Construction and career 
Al Jubail was laid down on 15 January 2020 and launched on 2 July 2020 at the Navantia yard in San Fernando.

References 

2020 ships
Ships built in Spain
Al Jubail-class corvettes
Ships of the Royal Saudi Navy